The 5th Annual Latin American Music Awards was held at the Dolby Theatre in Los Angeles, California. It was broadcast live on Telemundo. Ozuna lead the nominations with nine nods.

Nominees and Winners 
The nominations were announced on September 4, 2019.

Multiple nominations and awards

Special Honor

International Artist Award of Excellence: Marc Anthony

References

External links

 Official site in Facebook
 Official site in Instagram
 Official site in Twitter

2019 music awards
2019 in Latin music
2019 in Los Angeles